Laughton is a small village and parish situated in Leicestershire, approximately 5 miles west of Market Harborough. Old buildings dominate Laughton with currently only two modern buildings situated in the village. There is a row of cottages opposite the church that has parts dating back to medieval times. The church itself dates back to the 13th century and had a major renovation in 1879. The population is included in the civil parish of Gumley.

References

External links
 
Census 2001 Parish Profile
Laughton Parish Walks
Ordnance Survey mapping of Laughton
 Photographs in and near Laughton from Geograph
 'Laughton', A History of the County of Leicestershire: Volume 5: Gartree Hundred (1964), pp. 213-220.
Search for designated historic sites and buildings in Laughton

Villages in Leicestershire
Civil parishes in Harborough District